Yevgeni Borisovich Malakhov (born 17 November 1982) is a former Russian professional footballer.

Club career
After playing in the reserves, he made his debut in the Russian Premier League in 2002 for FC Uralan Elista.

References

External links
 

1982 births
Living people
Russian footballers
FC Lada-Tolyatti players
FC Elista players
Russian Premier League players
FC Volga Nizhny Novgorod players
Association football midfielders
FC Novokuznetsk players